Mohan Poothathan is an Indian beach volleyball player. Along with Pradeep John, Poothathan entered the finals of the 15th Asian Games of 2006 held at Doha, Qatar defeating Philippines.  But they lost to the Japanese pair of Kentaro Asahi and Katsuhiro Shiratori.

He competed at the 2012 Asian Beach Games in Haiyang, China.

References

Living people
Indian men's volleyball players
Beach volleyball players at the 2002 Asian Games
Beach volleyball players at the 2006 Asian Games
Year of birth missing (living people)
Place of birth missing (living people)
Asian Games competitors for India